The Qingdao Aquarium also known as the Qingdao Underwater World is the oldest public aquarium in China. It is located in the city of Qingdao, Shandong Province. The aquarium originated from an initiative launched by the educator Cai Yuanpei in 1930 and was first opened to the public on May 8, 1932. As of 2013, the aquarium consists of four main exhibition halls that are connected by tunnels and provides nearly 10,000 square meters of total exhibition area. The Qingdao Aquarium has been listed as a major historical and cultural sites protected by Shandong Province since 2006 (site number 3-267). It is located right on shore of the Yellow Sea's Huiquan Bay, next to the "No. 1 Bathing Beach" in the Shinan District of Qingdao.

The aquarium, opening from 8:30 am to 5 pm, consists of  the major aquarium, the sea animal performance museum, the museum of freshwater animals, and the herbarium of marine organisms.

See also
Major historical and cultural sites protected by Shandong Province

References

Buildings and structures in Qingdao
Tourist attractions in Qingdao
Aquaria in China